The Lockheed Martin F-35 Lightning II is an American stealth fighter aircraft.

F35 or F-35 may also refer to:

 F-35 Draken (introduced 1955), an export variant of the Saab 35 Draken aircraft
 Possum Kingdom Airport, FAA location identifier F35, a public airport in Texas, US
 Route F35 (Iceland), a highland road in Iceland
 F35 transmission (introduced 1984), a Saab-designed five-speed manual transaxle
 BMW 3 Series (F35) (introduced 2012), a long wheelbase version of the BMW 3 Series (F30)
 F35 (classification), classification at the Paralympic Games for club, discus throw, shot put and javelin